The 2002 season was the Tampa Bay Buccaneers' 27th in the National Football League (NFL). It was one of the most successful seasons in franchise history, ending with a victory in Super Bowl XXXVII.

The season began with the team trying to improve on a 9–7 season and did so with a franchise-best 12–4 record. It was Jon Gruden's first season as the Buccaneers’ head coach. They won the Super Bowl for the first time in the team's history, beating the Oakland Raiders 48–21. This was Tampa Bay's only Super Bowl appearance and win until 2020, with the Super Bowl win also being their most recent playoff game win in the same span. The 2002 Buccaneers’ defense is often cited as one of the best ever, as well as one of the most potent pass defenses in league history.

Summary

In January 2002, after losing in the wild card round to the Eagles for the second consecutive year, the Buccaneers fired head coach Tony Dungy. After that they began a prolonged search for his replacement. Potential candidates included Gators head coach (and former Buccaneers quarterback) Steve Spurrier, former Giants head coach Bill Parcells, Ravens defensive coordinator Marvin Lewis, and Raiders head coach Jon Gruden. Parcells passed on the offer, while Spurrier took the job at Washington. Tampa Bay general manager Rich McKay threw his support behind Lewis but the Glazers were displeased with the selection of yet another defensive-minded coach that they overruled McKay and took control of the candidate search themselves. They made it clear that their top choice was Gruden; however, he was still under contract with the Raiders. While talks with the Raiders were secretly underway, the Glazers publicly pursued 49ers head coach Steve Mariucci. But shortly thereafter, Al Davis agreed to release Gruden to Tampa Bay, but the move was costly. Tampa Bay paid Oakland with two first-round draft picks (2002, 2003), two second-round picks (2002, 2004) and $8 million in cash payments.

Upon his arrival in Tampa Bay, Gruden immediately went to work, acquiring former Jaguars WR Keenan McCardell, and RB Michael Pittman from the Cardinals. The Buccaneers needed to improve their sluggish offense, as the league's sweeping realignment sent them to the new NFC South division, along with Atlanta, Carolina and New Orleans.

The offense made slight improvements during the season, but the strength of the team was the defense. The 2002 Buccaneers became the first team to lead the league in total defense, points allowed, and interceptions since the 1985 Chicago Bears. They also held opposing quarterbacks to an unbelievable 48.4 passer rating for the season. Led by this dominating defense, the 2002 Buccaneers achieved their most successful season to date. They won the NFC South title with the team's best ever record, 12–4, and then defeated the 49ers in what became coach Steve Mariucci’s last game with that franchise. In a surprising upset, Tampa Bay won their first NFC Championship on the road against the Eagles in the last NFL game ever played at Veterans Stadium. Cornerback Ronde Barber capped off the win by intercepting a Donovan McNabb pass and returning it 92 yards for a touchdown late in the fourth quarter.

The Buccaneers went on to rout Gruden's former team, the Oakland Raiders, by a score of 48–21 in Super Bowl XXXVII. Gruden's familiarity with the Raiders’ players and playbook paid off, as John Lynch and other Buccaneer players recognized some of Oakland's formations and plays at crucial points in the game. The Bucs became the first team to win the Super Bowl without any picks in the first two rounds of the previous spring's draft, having traded these picks to the Oakland Raiders for the rights to acquire Gruden. At the time, Gruden made history by becoming the youngest head coach to win a Super Bowl.

Offseason

2002 expansion draft

2002 NFL draft

Tampa Bay signed rookie free agent Ryan Nece, a linebacker from UCLA after the draft.

Staff

Roster

Preseason
During the offseason, the Buccaneers signed a new deal with Walt Disney World, and moved their Training Camp from the University of Tampa to Disney's Wide World of Sports Complex outside of Orlando.

During the first preseason game against the Miami Dolphins on Monday night August 12, which served as Jon Gruden's first coached game (albeit preseason), Frank Murphy took the opening kickoff 95 yards for a touchdown. It was the Buccaneers' fifth kickoff return touchdown in the preseason, however, at the time, the team had still never returned a kickoff for a touchdown in the regular season (and would do so not until 2007).

Schedule

Regular season

Schedule

Game summaries

Week 1: vs. New Orleans Saints

Jon Gruden’s era in Tampa Bay began at home against new division rival, the New Orleans Saints, a team they'd soundly beaten the year before. Though heralded for his offensive expertise, the Buccaneers offense sputtered and was anemic for the first three quarters. The Saints held a 20–10 lead late in the fourth quarter, while Tampa Bay's offense had only 161 yards through three periods, and quarterback Brad Johnson was sacked three times, on a hot, humid 90° afternoon.

With just under three minutes remaining, Brad Johnson led the Buccaneers on touchdown drive to narrow the score to 20–17. In the final two minutes, the offense finally performed, as Johnson drove the Buccaneers to the Saints 34-yard line. Tampa Bay faced 4th down with 23 seconds to go and counting, and no timeouts remaining. Martín Gramática hurried onto the field and kicked a game-tying field goal as time expired, and forced overtime.

Tied 20–20 in the overtime period, Tampa Bay received, and quickly drove to the Saints 39-yard line. With the choice of a field goal attempt of over 55 yards, Gruden elected to punt. The teams traded possession twice, and with just over 4 minutes remaining in the overtime, Tampa Bay was pinned back at their own 5-yard line. Tom Tupa attempted to punt on 4th down from the endzone, but Fred McAfee was unblocked. Tupa avoided the tackle, and attempted a desperation shovel pass to John Howell from his non-throwing arm. The ball was intercepted by James Allen, standing in the confines of the endzone, and the Saints were credited with a game-winning touchdown.

Week 2: at Baltimore Ravens

Tampa Bay rebounded in week 2 against the Baltimore Ravens. Karl Williams returned a punt 56 yards for a touchdown, and Martín Gramática scored three field goals. Derrick Brooks sealed the victory and secured the shutout with a 97-yard interception return touchdown with 1:06 to go.

Prior to the start of the game the Baltimore Ravens remembered Baltimore football legend Johnny Unitas in a variety of touching ways. Once the game began, Bucs passer Brad Johnson fashioned his own fitting tribute to the legendary quarterback.

On one of his best days as a Buccaneer, Johnson completed over 75% of his passes as Tampa Bay picked up a road win that was mostly devoid of tension. The Bucs shared in Baltimore's emotion during the pregame, then drained all drama from the game itself by sprinting out to a 10–0 lead and rarely letting Baltimore onto its half of the field.

Johnson completed all five of his passes on the Bucs’ opening drive, leading to a 36-yard Martin Gramatica field goal, and WR Karl Williams followed five minutes later with a 56-yard punt return for a touchdown. Staked to a 10–0 lead, Tampa Bay's defense needed no more, pitching just the second road shut out in franchise history (the first: a 35–0 victory at Cincinnati in 1998). The Bucs’ D, somewhat perturbed at its own performance in last Sunday's opener, even tied a bow on the affair in the final minutes when LB Derrick Brooks intercepted QB Chris Redman's pass at Tampa Bay's three and returned it 97 yards for a touchdown.

Week 3: vs. St. Louis Rams

On Monday night, the Buccaneers hosted the St. Louis Rams, continuing a brief, but budding rivalry between the two clubs. The Tampa Bay defense intercepted Kurt Warner four times, and held a 19–14 lead late in the fourth quarter.

With just over a minute to go, Warner drove the Rams to their 34-yard line, but Derrick Brooks intercepted his pass and returned it 39 yards for a touchdown, his second such score in two weeks. Tampa Bay won 26–14, and improved to 2–1.

Week 4: at Cincinnati Bengals

Tampa Bay crushed the Bengals 35–7. Brad Johnson threw three touchdown passes (of 35 yards, 65 yards and 22 yards, respectively), while Shelton Quarles returned an interception 25 yards for a score (Tampa Bay's third defensive score in three weeks).

If the first quarter was a minor struggle, the rest of the game was relatively easy for the Buccaneers, as signified by the first play of the second period. Brad Johnson, who had yet another strong day, pump-faked left from the Bengals' 35-yard line, drawing coverage away from Rickey Dudley down the middle of the field. Johnson then lofted a perfect pass to a wide-open Dudley for a 35-yard touchdown. It was Dudley's second score in two games as a Buccaneer.

Six minutes and two possessions later, Johnson lofted a high floater on the left sideline to another wide-open man, Keenan McCardell. McCardell had no tacklers within 20 yards of him as he trotted into the end zone for a 65-yard score.

Week 5: at Atlanta Falcons

Tampa Bay visited another new division rival, the Atlanta Falcons. The Buccaneer defense dominated yet another game, holding the Falcons to only 3 first half points, despite giving up good field position (the Falcons had a 47-yard kickoff return, a fumble recovery and a recovered onside kick).

On the first drive of the third quarter, quarterback Michael Vick was knocked out of the game after a sack by Simeon Rice. Doug Johnson took over at quarterback for the Falcons, and did not fare well. Though the Falcons took a 6–3 lead midway through the third period, the lead was short-lived. Three plays later, Brad Johnson connected on a 76-yard touchdown pass to Keyshawn Johnson, and a 10–6 lead. After a Martín Gramática field goal stretched the lead to 13–6, Tampa Bay pinned the Falcons on their own 16-yard line with 6:24 to go in the game. Doug Johnson was being sacked but got the ball off, which was, in turn, intercepted by Warren Sapp at the Atlanta 15-yard line. Sapp lateraled to Derrick Brooks who then ran for a touchdown. It was Tampa Bay's fourth consecutive game with a defensive score, and Brook's third of the season.

Tampa Bay won by a final score of 20–6, and improved to 4–1.

Week 6: vs. Cleveland Browns

Tampa Bay hosted Cleveland, and notched their first ever win against the Browns franchise (having lost all five meetings against the pre-1996 club) by a score of 17–3. Fullback Mike Alstott was the most notable player of the day, rushing 17 times for 126 yards and two touchdowns. In the fourth quarter, Alstott rumbled 19 yards, shaking at least seven tackles, for one of the more memorable plays of his career.

Despite the convincing win, the Buccaneers kicking game suffered several woes. One field goal attempt was blocked, one sailed wide left, and another was foiled by a botched snap. A light rain doused the stadium in the second half.

Week 7: at Philadelphia Eagles

Derrick Brooks recovered and returned a Donovan McNabb fumble for a touchdown (his fourth defensive score of the season), but Tampa Bay could not prevail over the Eagles at Veterans Stadium, falling 20–10. It marked the third straight loss at Veterans Stadium for the Buccaneers, and the fourth straight loss overall to the Eagles.

Early in the game, quarterback Brad Johnson suffered a rib injury, but managed to stay in the game. With 14 minutes to go, physically beaten and exhausted, Johnson lofted a pass intended for Keyshawn Johnson, and it was intercepted. He lacked strength due to the bruised rib. Brad Johnson was benched and would not return to the game. The turnover sealed the victory for the Eagles.

Week 8: at Carolina Panthers

Rob Johnson started for the injured Brad Johnson, and managed to guide the Buccaneers to a tough 12–9 win over the Carolina Panthers. Martín Gramática hit four field goals (32, 52, 53, and 47 yards respectively) for Tampa Bay's only points.

In the final minute, tied 9–9, Rob Johnson drove the Buccaneers into Carolina territory. With 21 seconds to go, Johnson scrambled for a 9-yard run, and was pushed out of bounds at the Carolina 35. But he was injured on the play. Third-string quarterback Shaun King scurried off the bench cold, and delivered a clutch 7-yard pass to Karl Williams. With 5 seconds to go, Gramatica kicked the game-winning field goal.

Week 9: vs. Minnesota Vikings

Brad Johnson returned to the lineup, throwing five touchdown passes (including two to Keyshawn Johnson), and a total of 313 yards, as the Buccaneers rolled 38–24 over the visiting Vikings.

Under Brad Johnson's jersey on Sunday was a flak jacket, designed to protect the two fractured ribs on his left side.

With the win, the Buccaneers moved to 7–2, tying the 1979 team for the best start in franchise history. With Green Bay (6–1) playing on Monday night and New Orleans (6–2) having the week off, Tampa Bay was the first NFC team to reach seven wins. They held a half-game edge over the Saints in the NFC South race

Week 11: vs. Carolina Panthers

Brad Johnson threw two touchdown passes, and Martín Gramática kicked three field goals, in a 23–10 win over the Panthers. The Buccaneers swept the season series with Carolina, and posted a franchise-best 8–2 start.

The Bucs reached that franchise high-water mark on Sunday with a 23–10 victory over Carolina, in the process moving into a tie with former division rival Green Bay for the best record in the NFL. Tampa Bay and Green Bay square off for sole possession of the league's best mark next Sunday in Raymond James Stadium.

After the Bucs defeated Carolina, 12–9, in an "ugly" game three weeks ago in Charlotte, the rematch was billed as another defensive struggle, though with a twist. While this was indeed a matchup of the league's first and third-ranked defenses, it also marked the returns of starting quarterbacks Brad Johnson and Rodney Peete, each of whom missed the last game between the two. Statistically, Johnson and the Bucs’ defense came out on top, though Bucs Head Coach Jon Gruden complimented the Panthers’ work, as well.

Week 12: vs. Green Bay Packers

Longtime rival Green Bay came to Raymond James Stadium, with the best record in the NFC on the line. In the first quarter, Brett Favre connected on a touchdown pass to Donald Driver to take the lead 7–0. Tampa Bay scored a field goal at the end of the first half, and the score was 7–3 at halftime. The Buccaneers scored another field goal in the third quarter, narrowing the deficit to 7–6.

On the first play of the next drive, Favre was intercepted by Brian Kelly, who returned the ball to the Packers 18-yard line. During the return, Chad Clifton was jogging downfield away from the main action and was blindsided by Warren Sapp. Clifton laid motionless on the field for several minutes and was carted off the field with a season-ending pelvic injury. The turnover led to a Brad Johnson touchdown pass to Joe Jurevicius, followed by a two-point conversion catch by Keyshawn Johnson, and a 14–7 lead.

Ronde Barber, Dexter Jackson, and Brian Kelly intercepted three more Favre passes, and Tampa Bay won convincingly 21–7. At 9–2, the Buccaneers stood with the best record in the NFC conference. After the game, Sapp and Packers coach Mike Sherman were involved in a confrontation on the field, exchanging heated words. The Sapp hit was regarded by some as a cheap shot, but Clifton would recover fully from the injury, and Sapp defended his actions, and was not penalized by the league.

Week 13: at New Orleans Saints

Mike Alstott scored a 44-yard touchdown catch, and Keenan McCardell caught another late in the game, but the Buccaneers fell to the Saints, 23–20 on Sunday Night Football. Brad Johnson was intercepted once, lost a fumble, and Aaron Stecker lost another fumble, as the Saints swept Tampa Bay for the season.

The Bucs, leading the NFL in turnover differential entering the weekend, had a difficult time holding onto the ball, fumbling four times and losing two of those loose balls. QB Brad Johnson was also intercepted for the first time in four games, and those three giveaways, plus a pair of long returns by Michael Lewis in the third quarter turned a 9–6 halftime lead into a 20–9 deficit. It was a lead the Saints never relinquished.

Brooks got off to a slow start, completing just one pass for two yards in the first quarter, but he heated up in the second and third periods, engineering one first-half touchdown drive and throwing two scoring passes in the third quarter. By the end of the game, he had a strange mix of numbers, completing just nine of 25 passes for 155 yards but throwing two touchdowns and no picks. Added to his two-touchdown day in a season-opening, 26–20, overtime Saints win in Tampa, Brooks has four TD passes against Tampa Bay this season; the rest of the league has three in 10 games.

Week 14: vs. Atlanta Falcons

Falcons quarterback Michael Vick entered the game with considerable pregame hype and an eight-game unbeaten streak. Vick, however, was sacked twice by Tampa Bay, and held to only 125 yards passing and a measly 15 yards rushing. Meanwhile, Brad Johnson connected on four touchdowns (two apiece to Jurevicius and McCardell) as the Buccaneers won 34–10.

In two games against Tampa Bay, Vick has completed just 16 passes for 162 yards, one touchdown and one interception. On October six, Vick completed just four of 12 passes for 37 yards before sustaining an injured shoulder on a third-down Simeon Rice sack. He was hit hard several times on this Sunday as well, as the Bucs’ pass rush was relentless, but never left the game.

Plus, any thought that the second-year scrambler would run wild on the Bucs’ defense effectively ended on the third play of the game when LB Derrick Brooks hit him square in the chest after a one-yard scramble. After rushing just one time for one yard in the first Bucs–Falcons contest, Vick ran five times.

With the victory, Tampa Bay maintained its grip on first place in the NFC South with three weeks remaining. By game's end, the Bucs had a 1.5-game lead on both Atlanta and New Orleans, though the Saints’ late-afternoon game would either expand Tampa Bay's edge to two games or shrink it to one. The Bucs also became the first NFL team to 10 wins, at 10–3, as the 9–3 Philadelphia Eagles and Green Bay Packers were also scheduled for later games.

Week 15: at Detroit Lions

Mike Alstott and Michael Pittman each scored a rushing touchdown, but the visiting Buccaneers found themselves still tied 20–20 late in the fourth quarter with the 3–10 Lions. With 3:04 to go, Martín Gramática broke the tie with a 38-yard field goal, and Tampa Bay held on for a 23–20 victory.

Injuries plagued the Buccaneers that week, as John Lynch sat out the game with a neck strain. Keyshawn Johnson left the game with a groin injury, and Anthony McFarland broke his right foot and would miss the remainder of the season. Most notably, however, was quarterback Brad Johnson, who suffered a back injury during the game. He did not leave the game, but the severity of the injury was more significant than originally known. He would be sidelined during practice the following week.

Week 16: vs. Pittsburgh Steelers

With Brad Johnson sidelined, backup quarterback Shaun King started against the Steelers on Monday night. Tampa Bay was rocked 17–7 by the visiting Steelers, the second consecutive season being beaten soundly at home by Pittsburgh.

The night started out on a rough note even before kickoff, as during pre-game warm-ups Warren Sapp skipped through the Steelers. Jerome Bettis shoved Sapp, and this was followed by a heated argument between the two teams. The Buccaneers had also been ridiculed by Steelers' Lethon Flowers as being "paper champions."

On the first play of the game, Tommy Maddox's pass to Plaxico Burress gained 41 yards to the Tampa Bay 40-yard line. The Steelers drove 81 yards in only six plays, as Maddox connected with Antwaan Randle El for an 11-yard touchdown. On the second play of Tampa Bay's first drive, King was intercepted by Chad Scott, who returned the ball 30 yards for a touchdown, and a 14–0 lead less than four minutes into the game.

Trailing 17–0, Tampa Bay kicker Martín Gramática made a 50-yard field goal, but it was negated by a Pittsburgh penalty, and instead Tampa Bay was awarded a first down at the Pittsburgh 28-yard line. Four plays later, however, Mike Alstott lost a fumble at the 7-yard line, and the Steelers took a 17–0 lead into halftime.

Shaun King was finally benched having thrown for 73 yards and an interception on a pitiful 9-for-26. Rob Johnson took over in the second half, and salvaged the remainder of the game. With 1:23 to go, Keyshawn Johnson caught a touchdown pass, and avoided the shutout.

Week 17: at Chicago Bears

In the final week of the season, Tampa Bay traveled to Memorial Stadium in Champaign, Illinois, to meet the Chicago Bears. A win would secure the #2 seed and a first-round bye in the playoffs following the Green Bay Packers losing to the New York Jets earlier in the day. Brad Johnson sat out for the second game in a row, and Rob Johnson started the game for Tampa Bay.

Rob Johnson passed for 134 yards and no interceptions, and Michael Pittman rushed for 90 yards, but the Buccaneers offense could not score a touchdown. Martín Gramática kicked a franchise-best five field goals out of five, and his 15 points were the only scores of the game. Bears quarterback Henry Burris was intercepted four times by Tampa Bay (twice by Brian Kelly, and once each by Derrick Brooks and Dwight Smith).

With the win, Tampa Bay secured a bye for the wild card round and recorded the club's first win with the temperature under 40°. The Buccaneers finished with a franchise-best 12–4 record, along with a club-best 6–2 road record.

Standings

Postseason

Schedule

Game summaries

NFC Divisional Playoffs: vs. San Francisco 49ers

The Buccaneers hosted the 49ers, who were fresh off of the second largest comeback game in NFL post-season history at the time in the 39–38 wildcard round victory over the Giants. With the league's top-ranked defense during the 2002 regular season, the Buccaneers forced five turnovers; they intercepted quarterback Jeff Garcia three times and sacked him four times, and limited the 49ers to only two field goals. Tampa Bay quarterback Brad Johnson, who had been sidelined for a month, returned to throw for 196 yards and two touchdowns. Fullback Mike Alstott scored two touchdowns, while the Buccaneers held onto the ball for 36:46 and held the 49ers to a season-low 228 yards. This was San Francisco's first playoff game without a touchdown since 1986 and the 49ers' last playoff game until 2011.

NFC Championship: at Philadelphia Eagles

Tampa Bay won a road playoff game for the first time in franchise history, and in temperatures below , in the last football game played at Veterans Stadium. The Eagles were heavy favorites at home going into the game. The Eagles had beaten the Buccaneers four consecutive times, in the wild card round the two previous seasons, and also during regular-season games in 2001 and 2002. During the two playoff losses, both at Veterans Stadium, Tampa Bay had failed to score a single touchdown.

Eagles running back Brian Mitchell returned the opening kickoff 70 yards, setting up a 20-yard touchdown run by Duce Staley less than a minute into the game. Tampa Bay responded with Martín Gramática's 48-yard field goal on their ensuing drive. At the end of Philadelphia's next possession, Lee Johnson's punt pinned the Buccaneers back at their own 4-yard line. But Tampa Bay stormed 96 yards and scored with Mike Alstott's 1-yard touchdown run to take the lead. The key play on the drive was a 71-yard completion from Brad Johnson to Joe Jurevicius on third down and two from their own 24-yard line.

David Akers tied the score, 10–10, with a 30-yard field goal midway through the second quarter, but the Bucs responded with an 80-yard, 12-play drive that ended with a 9-yard touchdown pass from Brad Johnson to Keyshawn Johnson. With time running out in the half, Donovan McNabb led the Eagles to the Tampa Bay 24-yard line, only to lose a fumble while being sacked by his high school teammate Simeon Rice, who stripped the ball away and recovered it himself.

On the Eagles' first drive of the third quarter, McNabb lost another fumble due to a tackle from cornerback Ronde Barber, and Bucs defensive tackle Ellis Wyms recovered it. Later on, with 1:02 left in the third period, Gramatica's 27-yard field goal increased the Tampa Bay lead to 20–10. In the fourth quarter, the Eagles managed to drive 73 yards to Tampa Bay's 10-yard line, but Barber intercepted McNabb's pass with 3:12 left in the game and returned it 92 yards for a touchdown, clinching a trip to the Super Bowl for the first time in franchise history.

This was the last professional football game ever played at Veterans Stadium. The Eagles would move to Lincoln Financial Field for the 2003 season. The other team that occupied the Vet, the Philadelphia Phillies, would play the entire baseball season there in 2003 before they too left in 2004 to play in brand new Citizens Bank Park. As of 2022, both Philadelphia teams are still playing in those stadiums.

Super Bowl XXXVII: vs. Oakland Raiders

The Tampa Bay Buccaneers won their first Super Bowl, routing the Oakland Raiders 48–21. The Buccaneers defense intercepted Rich Gannon a Super Bowl record five times, and returned three of the interceptions for touchdowns. Safety Dexter Jackson was named the game's MVP.

As many sports fans and writers predicted, Gruden's prior knowledge of the Raiders was a major factor in the Buccaneers’ win in Super Bowl XXXVII. The most damaging piece of evidence is NFL Films footage of Tampa Bay safety John Lynch telling his teammates during the game that almost all of the plays ran by Oakland's offense were plays that Gruden (who that week even played the part of "Rich Gannon" by playing QB with the scout-team offense) specifically told them to look out for. Better still for the Buccaneers was that Oakland hadn't changed their audible-calling signals that Gruden himself had installed, thus tipping off plays repeatedly. As a result, Tampa Bay dominated Oakland, outgaining them in total yards (365 to 269), rushing yards (150 to 19), first downs (24 to 11), offensive plays (76 to 60), and forced turnovers (5 to 1).

The Raiders had a great chance to score a touchdown early in the game after cornerback Charles Woodson intercepted Buccaneers quarterback Brad Johnson's pass on the third play of the game and returned it 12 yards to the Tampa Bay 36-yard line. But 6 plays later, Tampa Bay defensive end Simeon Rice sacked Raiders quarterback Rich Gannon on third down, forcing Oakland to settle for kicker Sebastian Janikowski's 40-yard field goal to give them a 3–0 lead.

Buccaneers kick returner Aaron Stecker returned the ensuing kickoff 27 yards to the 29-yard line, then appeared to fumble the ball. Although the officials initially ruled that the ball was recovered by Oakland's Eric Johnson, the play was reviewed by instant replay and the fumble was overturned, and thus Tampa Bay retained possession.

On the first play of the drive, Brad Johnson completed an 11-yard pass to receiver Joe Jurevicius. Johnson's next 2 passes were incomplete, but he then completed a 23-yard pass to Jurevicius on third down to advance the ball to the Oakland 37-yard line. Running back Michael Pittman then rushed for a 23-yard gain to the 13-yard line. However, on the next three plays, the Raiders defense limited the Buccaneers to a pair of incompletions and a 1-yard run. Kicker Martin Gramatica then made a 31-yard field goal to tie the game, 3–3.

Later in the period, a 17-yard punt return by Raiders cornerback Darrien Gordon gave Oakland the ball at their own 49-yard line. Gannon then threw an 8-yard pass to running back Charlie Garner to reach the Tampa Bay 43-yard line. But on third down, Buccaneers safety Dexter Jackson intercepted Gannon's pass at the 40-yard line and returned it 9-yards to near midfield. Then nine plays after the turnover, Gramatica kicked his second field goal from 43 yards to give Tampa Bay a 6–3 lead.

Jackson intercepted another pass on the Raiders' next drive and returned it 25 yards to Oakland's 45-yard line, making Jackson the first player ever to record 2 interceptions in the first half of the Super Bowl. However, the Buccaneers were unable to take advantage of the turnover and were forced to punt. Fortunately for Tampa Bay, they got a big assist from their punter Tom Tupa, who managed to pin Oakland all the way back at their own 11-yard line with his punt. The Raiders could not move the ball either, losing 1 yard on 3 plays with their ensuing drive. Tampa Bay punt returner Karl Williams then returned Shane Lechler's punt 25 yards, giving the Buccaneers great field position at Oakland's 27-yard line. Aided with Pittman's gains of 6 and 19 yards, the Buccaneers scored their first touchdown on a 2-yard run from fullback Mike Alstott, increasing their lead 13–3. Then with 3:45 left in the half, Tampa Bay drove 77 yards, assisted by a pair of catches by Alstott for 28 total yards. Johnson finished the drive with a 5-yard touchdown pass to wide receiver Keenan McCardell to give the Buccaneers a 20–3 halftime lead.

Tampa Bay continued to dominate the game for most of the third quarter. The Buccaneers forced the Raiders to punt on the opening drive of the second half. Next, Tampa Bay marched 89 yards on a 14-plays drive that took 7:52 off the clock, and ended with Johnson's 8-yard touchdown pass to McCardell to increase their lead to 27–3. Then on the second play of Oakland's ensuing drive, Buccaneers defensive back Dwight Smith intercepted Gannon's pass and returned it 44 yards for a touchdown, making the score 34–3.

After giving up 34 unanswered points, Oakland finally managed to drive 82 yards down the field and score on a 39-yard touchdown pass from Gannon to receiver Jerry Porter. Although he was initially ruled as being out of bounds when he caught the ball, it was determined that Porter had one foot in the end zone and used it to drag the other foot out. The two-point conversion failed, so the Raiders were still down 34–9.

The Raiders' touchdown seemed to fire up their defense, who forced the Buccaneers to a fourth down on their ensuing possession. Oakland lineman Tim Johnson then blocked Tupa's punt, and Raiders defender Eric Johnson returned the ball 13 yards for a touchdown. Another two-point conversion for Oakland failed, but Tampa Bay's lead was cut to 34–15.

Tampa Bay responded by moving the ball to the Oakland 9-yard line on their ensuing drive, featuring a 24-yard run by Pittman, but they came up empty after Tupa fumbled the snap on a field goal attempt. A few plays later, Gannon threw a 48-yard touchdown pass to wide receiver Jerry Rice with 6:06 left in the game, cutting the Raiders deficit to 34–21. Rice became the first player to catch a touchdown pass in 4 different Super Bowls, and third overall to have TDs in 4 Super Bowls (Thurman Thomas and John Elway). The two-point conversion failed when Jerry Porter caught the ball and was forced out of bounds; while the official did not judge it to be a force-out, (judgement call) hence, that part of the play was non reviewable.

In an attempt to prevent a Raiders comeback, the Buccaneers managed to run the clock down to 2:44 on their ensuing drive before being forced to punt. Then on third and 18 from the Oakland 29-yard line, Tampa Bay linebacker Derrick Brooks intercepted a pass from Gannon and returned it 44 yards for a touchdown, giving the Buccaneers a 41–21 lead with only 1:18 left putting the game out of reach. And a few plays later as the Raiders were now playing for pride, Smith intercepted a tipped pass and returned it 50 yards for a touchdown (the 200th TD in Super Bowl history). this would be the team’s last playoff (and Super Bowl) win until the 2020 season.

References

External links
Pro Football Reference

Tampa Bay Buccaneers season
Tampa Bay Buccaneers
21st century in Tampa, Florida
National Football Conference championship seasons
NFC South championship seasons
Super Bowl champion seasons
Tampa Bay Buccaneers seasons